The 2010 Women's Futsal World Tournament was held in Spain from December 6 to December 11, 2010. It was the first World Tournament held under FIFA futsal rules. The venues were Pabellon José Caballero in Alcobendas and Pabellon Jorge Garbajosa in Torrejon de Ardoz.

Venues

Referees
 Lilla Perepatics (Hungary)
 Francesca Muccardo (Italy)
 Danjel Janosevic (Croatia)
 Eduardo Fernándes (Portugal)
 Francisco Peña (Spain)
 Roberto Gracia (Spain)
 Francisco Gutiérrez (Spain)
 Marcelino Blázquez (Spain)

Group stage

Group A

Group B

Play-off round

Final ranking

References

2010 in futsal
International futsal competitions hosted by Spain
Women's Futsal World Tournament
World